Tina Michelle O'Brien (born 7 August 1983) is an English actress. She is best known for her portrayal of Sarah Platt in the long-running ITV soap opera Coronation Street (1999–2008, 2015–present). She also appeared in the BBC One drama series Waterloo Road (2010–2011).

Career
Born in Rusholme, Manchester, England, O'Brien was educated at Trinity C.E. High School. Her early acting roles included Children's Ward in 1997, The Cops in 1998 and Clocking Off in 2000. At the age of sixteen, she joined Coronation Street in October 1999, taking over the role of Sarah Platt from actress Lynsay King. Sarah's pregnancy with Bethany Platt won O'Brien Best Storyline at the British Soap Awards. She also won Best Newcomer at the National Television Awards and the TV Quick Awards.

Her first role after leaving Coronation Street was in the 2007 pantomime at Manchester Opera House, where she played the title character of Cinderella. Her first television role post-Coronation Street was in the ITV police television drama Blue Murder, filmed whilst four months pregnant, in which she played a character called Amy Kirkland. O'Brien expressed interest in doing televised dramas and theatre work,  although after becoming pregnant, she decided to put her career on hold.

In 2010, O'Brien starred in the sixth series of the BBC school drama Waterloo Road as Bex Fisher, the eldest daughter of the new headteacher Karen Fisher (Amanda Burton). In 2010, she also appeared in The Secret Diaries of Miss Anne Lister, in which she played the character of Miss Browne, a role which required her first on-screen lesbian kiss. Later in 2010, she appeared as a character in the new television drama Accused, written by Jimmy McGovern, as well as starring in the 2010 series of Strictly Come Dancing.  Her partner was Jared Murillo, and she was unable to perform in the third week due to illness. O'Brien was eliminated in the fifth week of the competition after failing to impress the viewers with her Argentine Tango. She fell into the bottom two alongside Felicity Kendal, who was saved thanks to the public vote.

From 4 December 2010 to 3 January 2011, O'Brien played the title character of Snow White in Manchester Opera House's 2010/2011 pantomime. Between 14 January and 13 February 2011, she participated in the 2011 Strictly Come Dancing Live Tour.

In October 2014, O'Brien announced that she would be reprising her role of Sarah Platt in Coronation Street in early 2015. The character returned on an episode broadcast on 30 March 2015.

Personal life

O'Brien is the godmother of Emily Walton, who played the original Bethany Platt, her on-screen daughter.

O'Brien was in a relationship with Ryan Thomas from 2003 to 2009. They have one daughter, Scarlett, who is now playing Izzie Charles in the 2023 reboot of Waterloo Road. 

O’Brien married Adam Crofts on New Year's Eve 2018. They have one son.

Filmography

Awards and nominations

References

External links
 

1983 births
Living people
Actresses from Manchester
English soap opera actresses
English stage actresses
English female models
English television actresses
English child actresses
People from Rusholme
English people of Irish descent
20th-century English actresses
21st-century English actresses